Shemaiah, a name which in Hebrew (שמע-יה shema-Ya) means "God Heard", may refer to:  

 Shmaya (tanna), rabbinic sage who was leader of the Pharisees in the 1st century BC
 Any of several people in the Bible/Christian Old Testament; see List of people in the Hebrew Bible called Shemaiah
 Shemaiah (exilarch), alleged exilarch mentioned in the Seder Olam Zuta, probably sometime in the early 2nd century BC

See also 
 Shema (disambiguation)